Naanu Matthu Gunda  is a 2020 Kannada-language comedy film directed by Srinivas Timmayya . It has an essemble cast of Shivaraj K.R. Pete, Samyukta Hornad, Prakash Belawadi. It was released on 24 January 2020.

Films about dogs

Plot
Shankar, an auto driver, finds a dog in his rickshaw. Feeling repulsive in the beginning, Shankar begins to warm for the dog and names him as Gunda. The emotional bond between Shankar and Gunda becomes strong that they become the talk of the town, which makes his wife Kavitha to feel jealous. Naanu Mutthu Gunda is a heartwarming story about these three lives coming together.

Cast
 Shivaraj K.R. Pete as Shankar
 Samyukta Hornad as Kavitha
 Prakash Belawadi
 Govinde Gowda

Release
Naanu Matthu Gunda was released on 24 January 2020 and received positive reviews from critics and audience.

Remakes
Navarasan bought the remake rights of the film and plans to remake it in Telugu, Tamil and Malayalam.

References

External links
 Nanu Matthu Gunda at IMDb

2020s Kannada-language films